Karl Friedrich Krüger (18 December 1765 – 21 April 1828) was a German actor and the brother of actress Caroline Demmer.

Life 
Krüger was born in Berlin. His father was a musician in the royal chapel in Berlin. He himself made his debut on 14 February 1785 at the Hoftheater in Berlin as Kosinsky in Schiller's drama The Robbers. In 1786–87 he was engaged—with his sister—in Weimar, later in Magdeburg and Hannover, and went to Amsterdam in 1789. In 1791 he returned to Weimar and worked there until 1793. At the Weimar premiere of Don Carlos, on 22 February 1792, he played Domingo. Further stations were again Amsterdam, Prague, Karlsbad, Chemnitz, Leipzig (1797–1799), Freiberg, Teplice and from 1800 Brünn.

In 1802 he went to the Wiener Burgtheater, to which he belonged until his death. He was regarded as an extremely versatile actor who later also appeared as a comedian. Ignaz Franz Castelli wrote about him:

He was married to the actress Karoline Krüger. His sister-in-law was Franziska Romana Koch and his father-in-law was Antonín Jiránek. Anna Feodorowna Krüger, also an actress, was his adopted daughter.

Krüger died in Vienna at the age of 62.

References

Further reading 
 Franz Carl Weidmann, Carl Krüger. In: Archiv für Geschichte, Statistik, Literatur und Kunst, Jg. 15, No 14/15, 2./4. February 1824, ; No 16, 6 February 1824,  (books.google.com)
 Constantin von Wurzbach. BLKÖ|Krüger, Karl in Biographisches Lexikon des Kaiserthums Oesterreich 13th part. Imperial Royal Court and State Printing Office, Vienna 1865, 
 
 Karl Friedrich Krüger in the Großes biographisches Lexikon der deutschen Bühne im XIX. Jahrhundert. Paul List publisher, Leipzig 1903, 
  (PDF; 193 kB)

External links 
 

1765 births
1828 deaths
18th-century German male actors
19th-century German male actors
German male stage actors
Male actors from Berlin